Rujište is a mountain (Veliko Rujište,  and Malo Rujište)  and ski resort situated between the elevations of  and   in the municipality of Mostar, Bosnia and Herzegovina. It is located in mountain range Prenj.

See also
List of mountains in Bosnia and Herzegovina

References

Mountains of the Federation of Bosnia and Herzegovina
Ski areas and resorts in Bosnia and Herzegovina
Mountains of Bosnia and Herzegovina
Herzegovina-Neretva Canton